Blythe Township may refer to the following townships in the United States:

 Blythe Township, Boone County, Arkansas
 Blythe Township, Schuylkill County, Pennsylvania